Steve Sutton (born Abertillery, 17 February 1958) is a former Welsh rugby union player who played as a lock.

Career
He started his club career playing for Pontypool RFC, where he played until the 1979–80 Season, where he played for Ebbw Vale RFC, years later, he would play for South Wales Police RFC. Sutton had his first cap for Wales in the 1982 Five Nations Championship match against France in Cardiff, on 6 February 1983. He was part of the 1987 Rugby World Cup Welsh squad, playing three matches in the tournament, with the third place final against Australia, in Rotorua, on 18 June 1987 being his last international cap for Wales.

Notes

External links
Steve Sutton international stats

1958 births
Living people
Ebbw Vale RFC players
Pontypool RFC players
Rugby union locks
Rugby union players from Abertillery
South Wales Police RFC players
Wales international rugby union players
Welsh rugby union players